Riazuddin (15 December 1958 – 11 June 2019) was a Pakistani cricket umpire. He stood in 12 Test matches between 1990 and 2002 and 12 One Day Internationals (ODIs) between 1990 and 2000. He also stood as one of the on-field umpires in the final of the 2010–11 Quaid-e-Azam Trophy. He officiated in 310 first-class matches, a Pakistan record.

On 11 June 2019, Riazzudin died of a heart attack at the age of 60.

See also
 List of Test cricket umpires
 List of One Day International cricket umpires

References

1958 births
2019 deaths
People from Karachi
Pakistani Test cricket umpires
Pakistani One Day International cricket umpires